Etuate Tamanikaitai Qionimacawa is a Fijian rugby league player currently playing for the Nadera Panthers in the Fiji National Rugby League.

Playing career
He made his international debut for Fiji in the 2016 Melanesian Cup against Papua New Guinea where he scored a hat-trick of tries.

References

Living people
Fijian rugby league players
Fiji national rugby league team players
Nadera Panthers players
Rugby league wingers
Year of birth missing (living people)